Vladimir Georgievich Gajdarov (Russian: Владимир Георгиевич Гайдаров; 25 July 1893 – 17 November 1978) was a Russian film actor and star of Russian and German silent cinema.

Filmography
Father Sergius (1917), as Nicholas I of Russia
Yeyo zhertva (1917)
Ne nado krovi (1917)
Iola (1920)
Die Gezeichneten (1922), as Jakow Segal
The Burning Soil (1922), as Johannes Rog
The Man in the Iron Mask (1923), as Louis XIV
Tragedy of Love (1923), as André Rabatin
The Countess of Paris (1923)
Love of Life (1924)
Helena (1924), as Paris
Liebet das Leben (as Wladimir Gaiderow) (1924)
Reluctant Imposter (1925)
The Wife of Forty Years (1925)
The Night Watch (1925)
Michel Strogoff (1926), as Tzar Alexandre of Russia
Manon Lescaut (1926), as Des Grieux
Battle of the Sexes (as Vladimir Gaidarow) (1926)
The Circus of Life (1926)
Madonna of the Sleeping Cars (as Vladimir Gaidaroff) (1927)
Alpine Tragedy (1927)
The White Slave (as Wladimir Gaidaroff) (1927), as Ali Benver Bey
Alpenglühen (1927)
 (as Wladimir Gaidaroff) (1927)
Orient (as Wladimir Gaiderow) (1928)
The Woman on the Rack (1928)
The Lady with the Mask (1928), as Alexander von Illagin
Rasputin (1928)
Heilige oder Dirne (1929)
Kire lained (1930)
Louise, Queen of Prussia (1931), as Zar Alexander
 Night Convoy (1932), as Mario Orbeliani
Stalingradskaya bitva I (1949), as Gen. Paulus
Stalingradskaya bitva II (1949), as Gen. Paulus
Geroite na Shipka (as V. Gajdarov) (1955)
Bare et liv - historien om Fridtjof Nansen (1968)

See also
Ossip Runitsch
Ivan Mozzhukhin
Vitold Polonsky

References

External links

Russian male film actors
Russian male silent film actors
Actors from Poltava
1893 births
1978 deaths